KROD (600 kHz) is a commercial AM radio station in El Paso, Texas, United States. It airs a sports format and is owned and operated by Townsquare Media. The offices and studios are located on North Mesa Street (Texas State Highway 20) in Northwest El Paso.

KROD broadcasts at 5,000 watts around the clock. At night, when radio waves travel farther, it uses a directional antenna to avoid interfering with other stations on AM 600. It is the West Texas primary entry point station for the Emergency Alert System. The transmitter is located off Dyer Street (U.S. Business Route 54) in far north El Paso.

Programming
The station is a network affiliate of ESPN Radio. KROD breaks from ESPN Radio on weekday afternoon drive time for "KROD Sportstalk with Steve Kaplowitz".  
The station carries Pacific Coast League baseball games as the flagship station of the El Paso Chihuahuas. It also broadcasts the El Paso Rhinos in the Western States Hockey League, UTEP Miners football, UTEP Miners men's basketball, UTEP Miners women's basketball, the NFL on Westwood One and Texas Longhorns football.

History

Early years
A construction permit for KROD was issued in 1936, to operate on 1500 kHz, then a local channel, with 100 watts full-time.  The station signed on the air on June 1, 1940, as El Paso's second radio station after KTSM, which was established in 1929. The call sign KROD stood for Dorrance D. Roderick, the station's original owner and the publisher of the El Paso Times newspaper. The studios were at 2201 Wyoming Street, now the home of Channel 38 KSCE. KROD was a CBS Radio Network affiliate, carrying its schedule of dramas, comedies, news, sports, soap operas, game shows and big band broadcasts during the "Golden Age of Radio".

A short time after going on the air, KROD increased its power to 250 watts and had a construction permit to move to 600 kHz. The move to AM 600 was coupled with an increase in power to 1,000 watts by day, 500 watts at night. A new four tower array was constructed during 1941.  The 600 kHz transmitter was on Dyer Street in Northeast El Paso, where the Sunrise Shopping Center now stands.  The transmitter moved to 10420 Dyer in the late 1960s.

Adding TV and FM stations
By 1950, KROD had increased its power to 5,000 watts full time.  An advertisement in the 1953 Broadcasting Yearbook said that KROD had the "greatest coverage of any radio station in El Paso," with the biggest audience, the largest dollar value and unrivaled local programs.  In 1952, a television station was added, Channel 4 KROD-TV (now KDBC-TV). Because KROD was a CBS affiliate, KROD-TV also aired CBS programming.

As network programming moved from radio to television, KROD began playing music. In 1959, KROD-AM-TV were acquired by Trigg-Vaughn Stations, with Cecil Trigg serving as President. KROD moved to a full service middle of the road (MOR) format of popular music, news and sports. The station used the catch phrase "The Big 600". The station also aired University of Texas at El Paso (UTEP) sports, specifically, NCAA Division I Men's Football and NCAA Division I Men's Basketball, for much of its history. This is depicted by the KROD banners in the movie Glory Road.

Channel 4 was sold to the Doubleday Broadcasting Company in 1973, changing its call letters to KDBC-TV, while KROD was sold to Desert Horizons, Inc.  In 1978, KROD added an FM station, 95.5 KLAQ.  While KROD continued its MOR format, KLAQ began by playing progressive rock music, later switching to album rock.

Oldies, talk, sports
In the 1980s, KROD switched to oldies music. New Wave Communications acquired KROD and KLAQ in 1995, switching AM 600 to a talk and sports format. In 1999, KROD and KLAQ changed hands again, this time to Regent Communications, Inc.

On January 18, 2011, KROD dropped its talk programming, changing to all sports, with programming from ESPN Radio. KROD and KLAQ were also acquired by Townsquare Media.

References

External links

1936 establishments in Texas
Radio stations established in 1936
ROD
Sports radio stations in the United States
Townsquare Media radio stations
UTEP Miners football
ESPN Radio stations